Chondroplea is a genus of fungi belonging to the family Gnomoniaceae.

The genus was first described by Klebahn in 1933.

Species:
 Chondroplea brenckleana
 Chondroplea populea

References

Gnomoniaceae
Sordariomycetes genera